Mamuara is a village in Bhuj Taluka of the Kutch district in the state of Gujarat, India.

History
The village was founded around the year 1600 AD. It is one of the most humid areas in Gujarat, with humidity levels reaching above 90 percent.

Economy
70% of people are in business of china clay and 30% are farmer. The people are mainly involved in agriculture, China clay and transport business. People are mainly involved in transportation china clay and cultivation of oilseeds, cotton and other seasonal crops. Other smaller sources of tea stalls, pesticides sales.

Etymology

References

Villages in Kutch district